Matheus Marcondes (born November 1903, date of death unknown) was a Brazilian long-distance runner. He competed in the marathon at the 1932 Summer Olympics.

References

1903 births
Year of death missing
Athletes (track and field) at the 1932 Summer Olympics
Brazilian male long-distance runners
Brazilian male marathon runners
Olympic athletes of Brazil
Athletes from Rio de Janeiro (city)